The 2010–11 UAB Blazers men's basketball team represented the University of Alabama at Birmingham in the 2010–11 NCAA Division I men's basketball season. The Blazers' head coach, Mike Davis, was in his fifth season at UAB. The Blazers, who compete in Conference USA, played their home games at Bartow Arena.

UAB finished the regular season atop the league standings and were subsequently named the 2011 Conference USA Champions. The Blazers were awarded the 1-seed for the 2011 Conference USA men's basketball tournament in El Paso but lost in their first tournament game. They received an at-large bid in the 2011 NCAA Division I men's basketball tournament where they lost in the new First Four round to Clemson. UAB finished with a record of 22–9 and 12–4 in Conference USA play.

Roster
Source

Schedule

All times are Eastern

|-
!colspan=9 style=|Exhibition

|-
!colspan=9 style=| Regular Season

|-
!colspan=9 style=| Conference USA Tournament
|-

|-
!colspan=9 style=| NCAA Tournament

See also
UAB Blazers men's basketball
2010–11 Conference USA men's basketball season

References

UAB Blazers men's basketball seasons
UAB
UAB